The Vernadsky State Geological Museum is the geological museum in Moscow. Mineralogical collection was founded in 1755 and is now an earth sciences and educational centre of the Russian Academy of Sciences.

History
Mikhail Lomonosov had studied mining principles in Germany, concluding that "it is necessary to use not only books, but objects of Nature", and it was he who came up with the principals of the charter of Moscow Imperial University, founded in January 1755, and for the founding of its mineralogical collection. The following month the Demidovs presented "the Mineral Study of Genkel" to the university. This collection was exhibited to the public in 1759 in the library of Aptekarsky House in the Department of Medicine. In 1778 Pavel Grigoryevich Demidov donated his own collection, along with 100,000 roubles for its maintenance, to the university and the new Faculty of Natural History and Agriculture was named after him.

External links

 
 Vernadsky State Geological Museum on worldwalk.info
 Vernadsky State Geological Museum at Google Cultural Institute.

Museums in Moscow
1755 establishments in the Russian Empire
Geology museums in Russia
Moscow State University

Natural history museums in Russia
Cultural heritage monuments of regional significance in Moscow